The 1911 Kansas State Aggies football team represented Kansas State Agricultural College in the 1911 college football season.

Schedule

References

Kansas State
Kansas State Wildcats football seasons
Kansas State Aggies football